Stilwell/Cherokee Nation Airport  is a public airport located three miles (5 km) southwest of the central business district of Stilwell, in Adair County, Oklahoma, United States. It is owned by the Cherokee Nation.

This airport was included in the National Plan of Integrated Airport Systems for 2007–2011, which categorized it as a general aviation facility.

Facilities 
Stilwell/Cherokee Nation Airport covers an area of 109 acres (44 ha) at an elevation of 1,084 feet (330 m) above mean sea level. It has one asphalt paved runway designated 18/36 which measures 4,200 by 60 feet (1,280 x 18 m).

References

External links 
 Stilwell/Cherokee Nation Airport (O11) at Oklahoma Aeronautics Commission
 Aerial image as of March 1995 from USGS The National Map
 Aeronautical chart from SkyVector

Defunct airports in Oklahoma
Airports in Oklahoma
Buildings and structures in Adair County, Oklahoma